The Tachikawa R-38 was a Japanese training aircraft of the late 1930s. It was a single-engined parasol monoplane that was intended for use by civil training schools. Two examples were built, with the Japanese Military's control of resources preventing any further production.

Design and development
In 1938, the Tachikawa Aircraft Company, which was building large numbers of its Ki-9 and Ki-17 basic and primary trainers for the Imperial Japanese Army, began work on a new training aircraft for use by civilian training schools. The aircraft, the Tachikawa R-38, was a single-engined parasol wing monoplane. It had a fabric-covered welded steel tube fuselage and a wood and metal wing. The student and instructor sat in separate tandem open cockpits.

The first prototype was powered by a  Gasuden Jimpu seven-cylinder radial engine driving a two-bladed propeller and made its first flight on 22 February 1939. The aircraft was tested by the Japanese Army, with the conclusion that the lighter R-38 was superior to the Army's Ki-17 primary trainer, which used the same engine. As the Ki-17 was already in production, however, the Army had no need for a new trainer. A second prototype, the R-38-Kai was built powered by an experimental  Kosoku KO-4 four-cylinder air-cooled inline engine, produced by a subsidiary of Tachikawa. The R-38-Kai flew in July 1941.

No production of the R-38 or the R-38-Kai followed. From 1938, all major Japanese aircraft companies were required to be licensed by the government, with the armed services controlling the management of the companies. As there was no military requirement for the R-38, the Japanese Army prevented any further production.

Specifications (R-38)

References

R-38, Tachikawa
R-38
Aircraft first flown in 1939